The Story of a Murder is an East German drama film directed by Joachim Hasler. It was released in 1965. The film is done following the novel of Leonhard Frank Die Jünger Jesu.

Cast
 Angelica Domröse as  Ruth Bodenheim
 Ulrich Thein as  Dr. Martin
 Jirí Vrstála as  Dr. Hoffmann
 Bohumil Smída as  Dr. Schäure
 Siegfried Weiß as  Dr. Rotholz
 Martin Flörchinger as  Zwischenzahl
 Hans Klering as  Direktor
 Willi Schwabe as  Lion
 Antje Ruge as  Esther
 Arno Wyzniewski as  David
 Monika Lennartz as  Johanna
 Stefan Lisewski as  Steve
 Helmut Schreiber as  Kapitän Liban

External links
 

1965 films
East German films
1960s German-language films
1965 drama films
German black-and-white films
1960s German films